The 2009 Men's Oceania Cup was the sixth edition of the men's field hockey tournament. It was held from 25 to 29 August in Invercargill.

The tournament served as a qualifier for the 2010 FIH World Cup.

Australia won the tournament for the sixth time, defeating New Zealand 3–1 in the final.

Teams

Results
All times are local (NZST).

Preliminary round

Pool

Fixtures

Classification

Final

Statistics

Final standings

References

2009
2009 in field hockey
2009 in Australian sport
2009 in New Zealand sport
2009 in Samoan sport
2009 Oceania Cup
August 2009 sports events in New Zealand
Sport in Invercargill
Oceania Cup